Scary Mother (also styled as Scarymother) were an Australian rock band. They were formed in 1990. Anthony Brown on lead guitar, Tim Burcham on drums, Andrew Gillespie on lead vocals and Toby (Tobias) Messiter (ex-Wildland) on keyboards. They released a self-titled three-track extended play in August 1992 via Mushroom Records' distributor MDS.

Scary Mother supported Faith No More in April and May 1993. The Australian group's first single, "Lord of the Flies", was issued to coincide with the tour and was produced by Matt Wallace (Faith No More). It was co-written by Brown, Burcham and Gillespie. They followed with their sole studio album, Tai Laeo (Thai for 'already gone') in May 1994. It was produced by Rick Will for ATI/Mushroom Records/Festival Records.

Australian musicologist, Ian McFarlane, described how, "[they] played a brooding, melodic brand of rock fleshed out by sweeping, atmospheric keyboard flourishes and barely restrained passion. Frontman Andrew Gillespie's vocals were likened variously to Pearl Jam's Eddie Vedder and The Cult's Ian Astbury, which was a good indication of [their] musical gambit." Brown, Gillespie and Messiter formed progressive rockers, Floating Me, in 2009, with Lucius Borich from Cog and Jon Stockman of Karnivool.

Band members

 Tim Burcham – drums
 Anthony Brown – guitar
 Andrew Gillespie – vocals
 Toby Messiter – keyboards
 Dorian West – bass guitar

Discography

Albums

Extended plays 

 Scary Mother (1992) – MDS

Singles 

"Lord of the Flies" (1993)
"Who are You?" (1993)
"Looking Down" (1994)

References 

Australian rock music groups
Musical groups established in 1990
Musical groups disestablished in 1995